Aluminium brass is a technically rather uncommon term for high-strength and partly seawater-resistant copper-zinc cast and wrought alloys with 55–66% copper, up to 7% aluminium, up to 4.5% iron, and 5% manganese. Aluminium bronze is technically correct as bronze, a zinc-free copper-tin casting alloy with aluminium content.

The term "special brass" is much more common for this, which then also includes alloys that add further characteristic elements to the copper-zinc base. In addition to the already mentioned elements of iron and manganese, lead, nickel and silicon can also be found as alloy components.

Due to their aluminium content, which is susceptible to oxidation at the usual melting temperatures in the range of 900 °C, the alloys require careful melting and melting treatment. Even when potting, attention must be paid to any oxides forming.

7000 series 
7000 series are alloyed with zinc, and can be precipitation hardened to the highest strengths of any aluminium alloy.  Most 7000 series alloys include magnesium and copper as well.

References

Further reading 

 Publication series of the DKI, Berlin, number L5 "Copper-Zinc alloys".
 Foundry lexicon. 17. Edition, Schiele and Schön, Berlin, ISBN 3-7949-0606-3.

Aluminium–zinc alloys